An election was held on November 2, 2004 to elect all 120 members to North Carolina's House of Representatives. The election coincided with elections for other offices, including the Presidency, U.S Senate, Governorship, U.S. House of Representatives, Council of State, and state senate. The primary election was held on July 20, 2004 with a run-off occurring on August 17, 2004. These elections were the first to use new district lines drawn by the General Assembly to account the for changes in population amongst each of the districts after the 2000 census. The 2002 elections had been conducted under a map ordered by the North Carolina Superior Court.

Results summary

Incumbents defeated in primary election
Michael Gorman (R-District 3), defeated by Michael Speciale (R)
Keith Williams (R-District 14), defeated by George Cleveland (R)
David Miner (R-District 36), defeated by Nelson Dollar (R)
Alex Warner (D-District 45) lost a redistricting race to Rick Glazier (D-District 44)
Stephen Wood (R-District 61), defeated by Laura Wiley (R)
Bobby Barbee Sr. (R-District 70), defeated by David Almond in the renumbered 67th district
Rex Baker (R-District 91), defeated by Bryan Holloway (R)
Michael Decker (R-District 94), defeated by Larry Brown (R) in the renumbered 73rd district 
Frank Mitchell (R-District 96) lost a redistricting race to Julia Craven Howard (R-District 79)

Incumbents defeated in general election
Don Munford (R-District 34), defeated by Grier Martin (D)
Sam Ellis (R-District 39), defeated by Linda Coleman (D)
Joanne Bowie (R-District 57), defeated by Pricey Harrison (D)
Wayne Sexton (R-District 66) lost a redistricting race to Nelson Cole (D) in the renumbered 65th district.

Open seats that changed parties
Michael Gorman (R-District 3) lost re-nomination, seat won by Alice Graham Underhill (D)

Newly created seats
District 4, won by Russell Tucker (D)
District 28, seat won by James Langdon Jr.
District 50, won by Bill Faison (D)
District 74, won by Dale Folwell (R)
District 88, won by Mark Hollo (R)
District 105, won by Doug Vinson (R)

Seats eliminated by redistricting
Charles Elliott Johnson (D-District 4) ran for the NC Senate after his district was merged with the 6th district.
Billy Creech (R-District 26) ran for the U.S House after the 28th district was merged with his district
Connie Wilson (R-District 104) didn’t seek re-election after the 105th district was merged with her district

Detailed Results

Districts 1-19

District 1 
Incumbent Democrat Bill Owens has represented the 1st District since 1995.

District 2 
Incumbent Democrat Bill Culpepper has represented the 2nd district and its predecessors since 1993.

District 3 
Incumbent Republican Michael Gorman has represented the 3rd district since 2003. Gorman lost re-nomination to fellow Republican Michael Speciale. Former Democratic representative Alice Graham Underhill defeated Speciale in the general election.

District 4 
The new 4th district includes all of Duplin County and a portion of Onslow County. Former Democratic representative Russell Tucker won the open seat.

District 5 
Incumbent Democrat Howard Hunter Jr. has represented the 5th district since 1989.

District 6 
The new 6th district includes the homes Incumbent Democrats Arthur Williams, who has represented the 6th district since 2003, and Charles Elliott Johnson, who has represented the 4th district since 2003. Johnson sought the Democratic nomination for Senate District 3 challenging incumbent Clark Jenkins, but he was defeated by Jenkins. Williams was re-elected here.

District 7 
Incumbent Democrat John Hall has represented the 7th district since his appointment on 2000.

District 8 
Incumbent Democrat Edith Warren has represented the 8th district and its predecessors since 1999.

District 9 
Incumbent Democrat Marian McLawhorn has represented the 9th district since 1999.

District 10 
Incumbent Republican Stephen LaRoque has represented the 10th district since 2003.

District 11 
Incumbent Republican Louis Pate has represented the 11th district since 2003.

District 12 
Incumbent Democrat William Wainwright has represented the 12th district and its predecessors since 1991.

District 13 
Incumbent Republican Jean Preston has represented the 13th district and its predecessors since 1993.

District 14 
Incumbent Republican Keith Williams has represented the 14th district since 2005. Williams lost re-nomination to fellow Republican George Cleveland. Cleveland won the general election.

District 15 
Incumbent Republican Robert Grady has represented the 15th district and its predecessors since 1987.

District 16 
Incumbent Republican Carolyn Justice has represented the 16th district since 2003.

District 17 
Incumbent Republican Bonner Stiller has represented the 17th district since 2003.

District 18 
Incumbent Democrat Thomas Wright has represented the 18th district and its predecessors since 1993.

District 19 
Incumbent Republican Danny McComas has represented the 19th district and its predecessors since 1995.

Districts 20-39

District 20 
Incumbent Democrat Dewey Hill has represented the 20th district and its predecessors since 1993.

District 21 
Incumbent Democrat Larry Bell has represented the 21st district and its predecessors since 2001.

District 22 
Incumbent Democrat Edd Nye has represented the 22nd district and its predecessors since 1985.

District 23 
Incumbent Democrat Joe Tolson has represented the 23rd district and its predecessors since 1997.

District 24 
Incumbent Democrat Jean Farmer-Butterfield has represented the 24th district since 2003.

District 25 
Incumbent Republican Bill Daughtridge has represented the 25th district since 2003.

District 26 
The new 26th district includes the homes Incumbent Republicans Billy Creech, who has represented the 26th district and its predecessors since 1989, and Leo Daughtry, who has represented the 28th district and its predecessors since 1993. Creech ran for the U.S House and Daughtry was re-elected here.

District 27 
Incumbent Democrat Stanley Fox has represented the 27th district and its predecessors since 1995. Fox didn’t seek re-election and fellow Democrat Michael Wray won the open seat.

District 28 
The new 28th district continues to be based in Johnston County and continues to favor Republicans. Republican James Langdon Jr. won the open seat.

District 29 
Incumbent Democrat Paul Miller has represented the 29th district and its predecessors since 2001.

District 30 
Incumbent Democrat Paul Luebke has represented the 30th district and its predecessors since 1991.

District 31 
Incumbent Democrat Mickey Michaux has represented the 31st district and its predecessors since 1985.

District 32 
Incumbent Democrat Jim Crawford has represented the 32nd district and its predecessors since 1995.

District 33 
Incumbent Democrat Bernard Allen has represented the 33rd district since 2003.

District 34 
Incumbent Republican Don Munford has represented the 34th district since 2003. Munford lost re-election to Democrat Grier Martin.

District 35 
Incumbent Democrat Jennifer Weiss has represented the 35th district and its predecessors since 1999.

District 36 
Incumbent Republican David Miner has represented the 36th district since 1993. Miner lost re-nomination to fellow Republican Nelson Dollar. Dollar won the general election.

District 37 
Incumbent Republican Paul Stam has represented the 37th district since 2003.

District 38 
Incumbent Democrat Deborah Ross has represented the 38th district since 2003.

District 39 
Incumbent Republican Sam Ellis has represented the 39th district and its predecessors since 1993. Ellis lost re-election to Democrat Linda Coleman.

Districts 40-59

District 40 
Incumbent Republican Rick Eddins has represented the 40th district and its predecessors since 1995.

District 41 
The new 41st district overlaps with much of the former 50th district. Incumbent Republican Russell Capps, who has represented the 50th district and its predecessors since 1995, was re-elected here.

District 42 
Incumbent Democrat Marvin Lucas has represented the 42nd district and its predecessors since 2001.

District 43 
Incumbent Democrat Mary McAllister has represented the 43rd district and its predecessors since 1991.

District 44 
The new 44th district overlaps with much of the former 41st district. Incumbent Democrat Margaret Dickson, who has represented the 41st district since 2003, was re-elected here.

District 45 
The new 45th district includes the homes of Incumbent Democrats Alex Warner, who has represented the 45th district and its predecessors since 1987, and Rick Glazier, who has represented the 44th district since 2003. Glazier defeated Warner in the Democratic primary and won the general election.

District 46 
Incumbent Democrat Douglas Yongue has represented the 46th district and its predecessors since 1994.

District 47 
Incumbent Democrat Ronnie Sutton has represented the 47th district since 1995.

District 48 
Incumbent Democrat Donald Bonner has represented the 48th district and its predecessors since 1997. Bonner didn’t seek re-election and fellow Democrat Garland Pierce won the open seat.

District 49 
Incumbent Democrat Lucy Allen has represented the 49th district since 2003.

District 50 
The new 50th district includes all of Caswell County and part of Orange County. Democrat Bill Faison won the open seat.

District 51 
Incumbent Republican John Sauls has represented the 51st district since 2003.

District 52 
Incumbent Republican Co-Speaker of the House Richard Morgan has represented the 52nd district and its predecessors since 1991.

District 53 
Incumbent Republican David Lewis has represented the 53rd district since 2003.

District 54 
Incumbent Democratic Majority Leader Joe Hackney has represented the 54th district and its predecessors since 1981.

District 55 
Incumbent Democrat Gordon Allen has represented the 55th district and its predecessors since 1997. Allen didn’t seek re-election and Democrat Winkie Wilkins won the open seat.

District 56 
Incumbent Democrat Verla Insko has represented the 56th district and its predecessors since 1997.

District 57 
Incumbent Republican Joanne Bowie has represented the 57th district and its predecessors since 1989. Bowie lost re-election to Democrat Pricey Harrison.

District 58 
Incumbent Democrat Alma Adams has represented the 58th district and its predecessors since 1994.

District 59 
Incumbent Democrat Maggie Jeffus has represented the 59th district since 1991.

Districts 60-79

District 60 
Incumbent Democrat Earl Jones has represented the 60th district since 2003.

District 61 
Incumbent Republican Stephen Wood has represented the 61st District since 2003. Wood lost re-nomination to fellow Republican Republican Laura Wiley. Wiley won the general election unopposed.

District 62 
Incumbent Republican John Blust has represented the 62nd District and its predecessors since 2001.

District 63 
Incumbent Democrat Alice Bordsen has represented the 63rd District since 2003.

District 64 
Incumbent Republican Cary Allred has represented the 64th District and its predecessors since 1995.

District 65 
The new 65th district includes the homes of Incumbent Democrat Nelson Cole, who has represented the 65th District since and its predecessors since 1997, and Incumbent Republican Wayne Sexton, who has represented the 66th district and its predecessors since 1993. Cole defeated Sexton in the general election.

District 66 
The new 66th district overlaps with much of the former 68th district. Incumbent Democrat Wayne Goodwin, who has represented the 68th district and its predecessors since 1997, didn’t seek re-election. He instead ran for Labor Commissioner and his wife, Democrat Melanie Wade Goodwin won the open seat.

District 67 
The new 67th district overlaps with much of the former 70th district. Incumbent Republican Bobby Barbee Sr, who has represented the 70th District since 1987, lost re-nomination here to fellow Republican David Almond. Almond won the general election.

District 68 
The new 68th district overlaps with much of the former 73rd district. Incumbent Republican Curtis Blackwood, who has represented the 73rd District since 2003, was re-elected here.

District 69 
Incumbent Democrat Pryor Gibson has represented the 69th district and its predecessors since 1999.

District 70 
The new 70th district overlaps with much of the former 67th district. Incumbent Republican Arlie Culp, who has represented the 67th District and its predecessors since 1989, was re-elected here.

District 71 
Incumbent Democrat Larry Womble has represented the 71st District and its predecessors since 1995.

District 72 
Incumbent Democrat Earline Parmon has represented the 72nd District since 2003.

District 73 
The new 73rd district overlaps with much of the former 94th district. Incumbent Republican Michael Decker(though he had spent much of the last term as a Democrat), who has represented the 94th district and its predecessors since 1985 lost re-nomination here to fellow Republican Larry Brown, who won the general election.

District 74 
The 74th district is based in Forsyth County and it is expected to favor Republicans. Republican Dale Folwell won the open seat.

District 75 
The new 75th district overlaps with much of the former 93rd district. Incumbent Republican Bill McGee, who has represented the 93rd District since 2003 was re-elected here.

District 76 
Incumbent Republican Fred Steen II has represented the 76th District since his appointment in February 2004. Steen was elected to a full term unopposed.

District 77 
Incumbent Democrat Lorene Coates has represented the 77th District since and its predecessors since 2001.

District 78 
Incumbent Republican Harold Brubaker has represented the 78th District and its predecessors since 1977.

District 79 
The new 79th district includes the homes of Incumbent Republicans Julia Craven Howard, who has represented the 79th District and its predecessors since 1989, and Frank Mitchell, who has represented the 96th district and its predecessors since 1993. Howard defeated Mitchell in the Republican primary and won the general election unopposed.

Districts 80-99

District 80 
Incumbent Republican Jerry Dockham has represented the 80th district and its predecessors since 1991.

District 81 
Incumbent Democrat Hugh Holliman has represented the 81st District and its predecessors since 2001.

District 82 
The new 82nd district overlaps with much of the former 75th district. Incumbent Republican Jeff Barnhart, who has represented the 75th district since 2001, was re-elected here.

District 83 
The new 83rd district overlaps with much of the former 74th district. Incumbent Republican Linda Johnson, who has represented the 74th District and its predecessors since 2001, was re-elected here.

District 84 
Incumbent Republican Phillip Frye has represented the 84th district since 2003.

District 85 
Incumbent Republican Mitch Gillespie has represented the 85th District since 1999.

District 86 
Incumbent Republican Walt Church has represented the 86th District and its predecessors since 1993.

District 87 
Incumbent Republican Edgar Starnes has represented the 87th District and its predecessors since 1997.

District 88 
The new 88th district includes all of Alexander County and a portion of Catawba County. Republican Mark Hollo won the open seat.

District 89 
Incumbent Republican Mitchell Setzer has represented the 89th District and its predecessors since 1999.

District 90 
Incumbent Democrat Jim Harrell has represented the 90th District since 2003.

District 91 
Incumbent Republican Rex Baker, who has represented the 91st District and its predecessors since 1995, lost re-nomination to fellow Republican Bryan Holloway. Holloway won the general election.

District 92 
Incumbent Republican George Holmes has represented the 92nd district and its predecessors since 1979.

District 93 
The new 93rd district overlaps with much of the former 82nd district. Incumbent Republican Gene Wilson, who has represented the 82nd district and its predecessors since 1995, was re-elected here.

District 94 
The new 94th district overlaps with much of the former 83rd district. Incumbent Republican Tracy Walker, who has represented the 83rd District and its predecessors since 2001, was re-elected here.

District 95 
Incumbent Republican Karen Ray has represented the 95th District since 2003.

District 96 
The new 96th district overlaps with much of the former 88th district. Incumbent Republican Mark Hilton, who has represented the 88th District and its predecessors since 2001, was re-elected here.

District 97 
Incumbent Republican Minority Leader Joe Kiser has represented the 97th District and its predecessors since 1995.

District 98 
Incumbent Republican John Rhodes has represented the 98th District since 2003.

District 99 
Incumbent Democrat Drew Saunders has represented the 99th District and its predecessors since 1997.

Districts 100-120

District 100 
Incumbent Democrat Co-Speaker of the House Jim Black has represented the 100th District and its predecessors since 1991.

District 101 
Incumbent Democrat Beverly Earle has represented the 101st District and its predecessors since 1995.

District 102 
Incumbent Democrat Becky Carney has represented the 102nd District since 2003.

District 103 
Incumbent Republican Jim Gulley has represented the 103rd District and its predecessors since 1997.

District 104 
The new 104th district contains the homes of Incumbent Republicans Connie Wilson, who has represented the 104th district and its predecessors since 1993, and Ed McMahan, who has represented the 105th District and its predecessors since 1995. Wilson didn't seek re-election and McMahan was re-elected here.

District 105 
The new 105th district continues to be based in Mecklenburg County and it is expected to favor Republicans. Republican Doug Vinson won the open seat.

District 106 
Incumbent Democrat Martha Alexander has represented the 106th district and its predecessors since 1993.

District 107 
Incumbent Democrat Pete Cunningham has represented the 107th District and its predecessors since 1987.

District 108 
Incumbent Republican John Rayfield has represented the 108th District and its predecessors since 1995.

District 109 
Incumbent Republican Patrick McHenry has represented the 109th District since 2003. McHenry ran for the U.S House and fellow Republican William Current won the open seat.

District 110 
Incumbent Republican Debbie Clary has represented the 110th District and its predecessors since 1995.

District 111 
Incumbent Republican Tim Moore has represented the 111th District since 2003.

District 112 
Incumbent Democrat Bob England has represented the 112th District since 2003.

District 113 
Incumbent Republican Trudi Walend has represented the 113th District and its predecessors since 1999.

District 114 
Incumbent Democrat Susan Fisher has represented the 114th District since her appointment in February 2004. Fisher was elected to a full term.

District 115 
Incumbent Democrat Bruce Goforth has represented the 115th District since 2003.

District 116 
Incumbent Republican Wilma Sherrill has represented the 116th district and its predecessors since 1995.

District 117 
Incumbent Republican Carolyn Justus has represented the 117th District since October 2002.

District 118 
Incumbent Democrat Ray Rapp has represented the 118th District since 2003.

District 119 
Incumbent Democrat Phil Haire has represented the 119th District and its predecessors since 1999.

District 120 
Incumbent Republican Roger West has represented the 120th District and its predecessors since 2000.

Notes

References

North Carolina House of Representatives
House of Representatives
2004